The  was a ship collision in Japan on 11 May 1955, during a school field trip, killing 168 people.

The Shiun Maru ferry sank in the Seto Inland Sea after colliding with another Japanese National Railways (JNR) ferry, the Ukō Maru, in thick fog.
A lack of radar onboard contributed to the accident. The victims included 100 students from elementary and junior high schools in Shimane, Hiroshima, Ehime and Kochi prefectures who were on school trips.
The sinking of the Shiun Maru motivated the Japanese government to plan the Great Seto Bridge project, the longest two-tiered bridge system in the world.

The 1955 accident was the fifth such accident of the boat and the second accident with fatalities.

See also
Akashi Kaikyō Bridge

References

External links
 List of Major Marine Accidents in the World and Japan
 Japanese Railway Ships

Ferries of Japan
Maritime incidents in 1955
Shipwrecks in the Pacific Ocean
Ships sunk in collisions
1955 in Japan
Maritime incidents in Japan
May 1955 events in Asia